"Love She Can't Live Without" is song co-written and recorded by American country music artist Clint Black.  It was released in June 2000 as the third single from the album D'lectrified.  The song reached #30 on the  Billboard Hot Country Singles & Tracks chart.  The song was written by Black and Skip Ewing.

Charts

References

2000 singles
Clint Black songs
Songs written by Clint Black
Songs written by Skip Ewing
Song recordings produced by Clint Black
RCA Records Nashville singles
1999 songs